SharpDevelop (also styled as #develop) is a discontinued free and open source integrated development environment (IDE) for the .NET Framework, Mono, Gtk# and Glade# platforms. It supports development in C#, Visual Basic .NET, Boo, F#, IronPython and IronRuby programming languages.

Features 
SharpDevelop was designed as a free and lightweight alternative to Microsoft Visual Studio, and contains an equivalent feature for almost every essential Visual Studio Express feature and features very similar to those found in Borland Kylix and Delphi, including advanced project management, code editing, application compiling and debugging functionality.  More specifically, the IDE includes a GUI designer, code/design views, syntax highlighting, auto completion menus (similar to IntelliSense) the ability to compile and debug form/console .NET Framework applications, a "New Project" wizard, toolbars, menus, panels and a docking system, and built-in code refactoring tools, and it has an integrated debugger that allows for stepping, viewing values of objects in memory, and breakpoints.

To allow for easy project migration, SharpDevelop works natively with Visual Studio project and code files. It is able to compile applications for .NET Framework version 2.0, 3.0, 3.5, 4.0, 4.5.1 and the .NET Compact Framework 2.0 and 3.5.

SharpDevelop's Graphic User Interface Designers work with the C#, VB.NET, Boo, and the IronPython and IronRuby languages, using the following GUI technologies:
 Windows Forms
 Windows Presentation Foundation (WPF)
 Entity Framework

SharpDevelop was written entirely in C# and consists of about 20 components that integrate to form the application. The source-code editor component, known as AvalonEdit,  can be used by other applications.

It also includes functionality for:
 External COM and ActiveX components
 Code analysis (FxCop)
 Unit testing (NUnit)
 Code coverage (PartCover)
 Profiler
 Subversion (TortoiseSVN)
 Git
 Mercurial
 StyleCop add-in
 Documentation generation (Sandcastle, SHFB)
 Plugins

History 
On 11 September 2000 Mike Kruger launched the project, while testing the first public release of .NET Framework 1.0. At that time there was no C#/.NET IDE publicly available. So he decided to write a code editor to run the compiler.  Early in its development, the project was split for Mono and Gtk# development into the MonoDevelop project, which is maintained as a cross-platform IDE, and after Microsoft's acquisition of Xamarin, has become the basis of Visual Studio for Mac.

 SharpDevelop had been downloaded at least 8 million times worldwide, The SharpDevelop codebase was documented in the book Dissecting a C# Application: Inside SharpDevelop (2003) written by the core development team and published by Wrox Press.

On 18 September 2017, Daniel Grunwald of the ICSharpCode team announced the project is "dead" for reasons related to the fast pace of changes to C# and .NET, including .NET Core, and suggested SharpDevelop users switch to either MonoDevelop or Visual Studio Code IDEs, each being recommended as a suitable open source replacement that is the target of regular updates and other maintenance.

See also

 Comparison of integrated development environments
 Microsoft Visual Studio
 
 Software development kit

References

External links 
 
 
 SharpDevelop at CodePlex

.NET programming tools
C Sharp software
Free integrated development environments
Free software programmed in C Sharp
Software using the LGPL license
Windows-only free software